Allan Corduner (born 2 April 1950) is a British actor. Born in Stockholm to a German mother and a Russo-Finnish father, Corduner grew up in a secular Jewish home in London. After earning a BA (Hons) in English and Drama at Bristol University he trained at the Bristol Old Vic Theatre School. He has worked extensively on stage, TV, and film, both in the UK and in the United States. His voice is familiar from many BBC radio plays, audio books and TV documentaries.

Corduner made his feature film debut in Yentl, with Barbra Streisand and Mandy Patinkin. Of his 44 films he is perhaps best known for his portrayal of Sir Arthur Sullivan in Mike Leigh's Topsy-Turvy. He also voiced Gehrman the first hunter in the 2015 video game Bloodborne.

Early life

Corduner grew up in a secular Jewish home in North London with his parents and younger brother.

His mother had escaped to Great Britain from Nazi Germany with her family in 1938. His father was born in Helsinki, Finland, of a Finnish-born mother and a Ukrainian-born father. Corduner's parents first settled in Stockholm, where he was born, but the family moved to London when he was one year old.

Interest in arts and music was always encouraged at home, and Corduner's early ambition was to become either an orchestra conductor or a concert pianist. He attended University College School in Hampstead, London. Although Corduner developed into a skilled jazz and classical pianist, musical aspirations had taken second place by the time he went to study at Bristol University and the Bristol Old Vic Theatre School.

Acting career

Corduner has worked extensively in theatre in London's West End and on Broadway, television as well as in film. He has also appeared in several BBC Radio plays including The Resistible Rise of Arturo Ui, Insignificance, and Fanny and Alexander.

His voice is familiar to listeners of audio books including The Book Thief. TV appearances include Exile, ITV's Midsomer Murders, Stephen Poliakoff's Dancing on the Edge, and as Andrea Verrocchio in seasons 1 and 2 of the Starz original series Da Vinci's Demons. He appears on seasons 5 and 6 of the Showtime TV series Homeland.

After drama school, Corduner's first two years as a professional actor were spent playing a wide variety of parts at Newcastle Repertory Theatre. Spells at the Birmingham Rep and the Actors' Company followed, until Corduner returned to London to make his West End debut in Mary O'Malley's Once a Catholic at the Wyndham's Theatre. Corduner has appeared several times at the Royal Court Theatre, in plays such as Three Birds Alighting on a Field, Fucking Games, Ice Cream, and most notably Caryl Churchill's satirical Serious Money, which subsequently transferred to London's West End and Broadway in New York.

He garnered acclaim on Broadway for the role of Etches in the musical Titanic. In February 2014, he played Etches again in a one-off concert version of Titanic at Avery Fisher Hall (now David Geffen Hall) in New York, re-uniting him with the original cast of the musical. He played Fritz Litten in Mark Hayhurst's Taken at Midnight, first at Chichester Festival Theatre, and subsequently at Theatre Royal Haymarket in West End.

One of his first film roles was in Yentl in 1982, with Barbra Streisand. He is probably best known for his portrayal of Sir Arthur Sullivan in Mike Leigh's Topsy-Turvy (1999), his first leading role in a feature film. Corduner's film work spans a variety of genres, such as action-adventure film Defiance, horror comedy film Burke and Hare, and western Medicine Men. Recent films include Woman in Gold (2015) and Tár (2022).

Voice acting
Corduner's voice is familiar to listeners of BBC radio plays such as Insignificance, The Resistible Rise of Arturo Ui and Fanny and Alexander. He was also the subject of BBC Radio 3 Private Passions.

Corduner has provided voices for various video game characters, notably the first, second, third and fifth Harry Potter video games (namely as, among others, Severus Snape, Lucius Malfoy, Fillius Flitwick and Argus Filch). He also voiced Apus, the pet parrot belonging to Queen Cassiopeia, the primary antagonist, for the English version of Ni no Kuni: Wrath of the White White which was released in February 2013. In 2015, Corduner voiced Gehrman, the First Hunter in Bloodborne.

Audiobooks and narration
Corduner is also known for solo narration of TV documentaries such as Fish Warrior for the National Geographic Channel, and various audiobooks for Simply Audiobooks, notably The Book Thief and Inkdeath. He also narrated Magyk written by Angie Sage and produced by Harper Audio. He has received two Earphones Awards by AudioFile His narration of "Anna and the Swallow Man" earned the Odyssey Award in 2017.

Personal life

Corduner's mother was from Berlin, Germany, and his father was born in Finland. He was born in Stockholm but grew up in London.

Corduner and his partner Juha Leppäjärvi met in 2006 in London, formed their civil partnership in December 2009, and married in New York City in August 2013. Corduner is a trustee of the children's arts charity Anno's Africa.

Filmography

Film

 Phoelix (1980)
 Sredni Vashtar (1981, Short, Oscar Nomination: Best Short Film 1983, BAFTA Winner: Best Short Film 1981)
 The Return of the Soldier (1982) .... Pianist at Party
 Yentl (1983) .... Shimmele
 Bad Medicine (1985) .... Dr. Diaz the Bus Driver
 Valhalla (1986) .... Loke (English version, voice, as Alan Corduner)
 Mandela (1987, TV Movie) .... Benny
 Hearts of Fire (1987) .... Music Executive
 Talk Radio (1988) .... Vince / Morris
 Fat Man and Little Boy (1989, aka Shadow Makers) .... Franz Goethe
 Edward II (1991) .... Poet
 Carry On Columbus (1992) .... Sam
 A Business Affair (1994) .... Dinner Guest
 Voices from a Locked Room (1995) .... Oscar Butterworth
 Indian Summer (1996) .... Therapist at Party
 The Impostors (1998) .... Captain
 Topsy-Turvy (1999) .... Sir Arthur Sullivan
 Joe Gould's Secret (2000) .... Francis McCrudden
 Gladiator (2000) .... Trainer 1 (extended edition)
 Zoe (2001) .... Rupert
 Kiss Kiss (Bang Bang) (2001) .... Big Bob
 Me Without You (2002) .... Max
 The Grey Zone (2001) .... Miklos Nyiszli
 The Search for John Gissing (2001) .... Francois Fuller
 Food of Love (2002) .... Joseph Mansourian
 Moonlight Mile (2002) .... Stan Michaels
 The King's Beard (2002) .... (voice)
 De-Lovely (2004) .... Monty Woolley
 The Merchant of Venice (2004) .... Tubal
 Vera Drake (2004) .... Psychiatrist
 Bigger Than the Sky (2005) .... Kippy Newberg
 A Higher Agency (2005, Short) .... Manager
 Against Nature (2005, Short) .... Des Esseintes
 The White Countess (2005) .... Samuel Feinstein
 The Waiting Room (2008) .... Fiona's Dad
 Fred Claus (2007) .... Dr. Goldfarb
 Defiance (2008) .... Shimon Haretz
 Mr. Nobody (2009) .... Dr. Feldheim
 Burke and Hare (2010) .... Nicephore
 A Thousand Kisses Deep (2011) .... Buddy
 An Enemy To Die For (2012) .... Martin
 The Sweeney (2012) .... Doctor
 Medicine Men (2012)
 Closer to the Moon (2014) .... Flaviu
 Amendment (2014, Short) .... Anthony
 Woman in Gold (2015) .... Gustav Bloch-Bauer
 Florence Foster Jenkins (2016) .... John Totten
 The Book of Gabrielle (2016) .... Saul
 Disobedience (2017) .... Moshe Hartog
 Miss Dalí (2018) .... Captain Moore
 Operation Finale (2018) .... Gideon Hausner
 Tár (2022) .... Sebastian 
 Abyzou (2023)

Television

 Buccaneer (1980) .... Monty Bateman
 Roots (1981, British comedy series) .... Melvin Solomons
 Freud (1984) .... Oscar Rie
 Girls on Top (1985) .... Benny
 Antonia and Jane (1990) .... Stephen Carlinsky
 Boon (1992) .... Dennis
 The Bill (1992–1994) .... Defence Barrister / Quigley / George Quigley
 Minder (1993) .... Marty
 Inspector Morse (1993) .... Gentile Bellocchio
 Teenage Health Freak (1993) .... Dr. Lime
 Heart of Darkness (1993, TV Movie) .... Verme
 Nobody's Children (1994, TV Movie) .... Ion
 Paris (1994) .... Minotti
 An Independent Man (1995) .... Robert Flower
 The Last Machine (1995)
 Stick With Me Kid (1995)
 No Bananas (1996) .... Benjamin Marks
 Norma Jean & Marilyn (1996, TV Movie) .... Billy Wilder
 Mad About You (1996) .... Osofsky
 Nostromo (1996–1997) .... Hirsch
 Love in the Ancient World (1997, TV Movie) .... Member at Platon's Guest meal
 Drop The Dead Donkey (1998) .... Art Critic
 Liverpool 1 (1999) .... Alan Pollock
 Fat Friends (2000-2005, series 1, 2 and 3) .... Leonard Harris
 The Way We Live Now (2001) .... Croll
 Foyle's War (2002) .... Carlo Lucciano
 Daniel Deronda (2002) .... Herr Klesmer
 Trust (2003) .... Michael Cohen
 The Last Detective (2004, series 2) .... Maurice Leyman
 La Femme Musketeer (2004) .... Aramis
 Heartbeat (2004–2005) .... Tristram Johnstone / Gerard Lowe
 The Strange Case of Sherlock Holmes and Arthur Conan Doyle (2005, TV Movie) .... Greenhough Smith
 Friends and Crocodiles (2005, TV Movie) .... Marcus
 Power of Art (2006, documentary) .... Mark Rothko
 Rome (2007, series 2) .... Clerk
 The Last Days of the Raj (2007, TV Movie) .... Lord Ismay
 The Whistleblowers (2007) .... Daniel Black
 No Heroics (2008) .... Shopkeeper
 A Passionate Woman (2010) .... Mr Solomon
 Lennon Naked (2010, TV Movie) .... Art Janov
 Grandma's House (2010) .... Richard
 Zen (2011) .... Michelangelo Gattuso
 Exile (2011) .... Geller
 Midsomer Murders (2012) .... Michael Hipsman
 We'll Take Manhattan (2012, TV drama) .... Alex Liberman
 Spies of Warsaw (2013) .... Viktor Rosen
 Dancing on the Edge (2013) .... Mr. Wax
 Da Vinci's Demons (2013–2014) .... Andrea Verrocchio
 Utopia (2014) .... Ross
 The Musketeers (2016) .... Van Laar
 Homeland (2015–2017, seasons 5 and 6) .... Etai Luskin
 The Collection (2016) .... Inspector Bompard
 Ridley Road (2021) .... Rabbi Lehrer
  Count Magnus (2022) .... the Deacon

Theatre
 My Fair Lady; Vivian Beaumont Theater, Broadway, New York City
 Murder on the Orient Express; McCarter Theatre
 Show Boat; Sheffield Crucible
 Taken at Midnight; Chichester Festival Theatre, Theatre Royal Haymarket*
 Passion; Donmar Warehouse*
 Winner of the Evening Standard Award for Best Musical 2010
 Hello, Dolly!; Regent's Park Open Air Theatre*
 Winner of the Evening Standard Award for Best Musical 2009
 Winner of the 2010 Olivier Award for Best Musical Revival, Best Choreography, Best Actress in a Musical (Samantha Spiro)
 A View from the Bridge; Duke of York's Theatre*
 Born in the Gardens; Theatre Royal, Bath
 The Grouch; West Yorkshire Playhouse, Leeds
 The Birthday Party; McCarter Theatre, Princeton, United States
 Two Thousand Years; Royal National Theatre*
 The Comedians; Acorn Theater, New York City
 Fucking Games; Royal Court Theatre*
 The Heart of Art; Off-Broadway, New York City
 Titanic; Lunt-Fontanne Theatre, Broadway, New York City
 Rosmersholm; Young Vic*
 Three Birds Alighting on a Field; Royal Court Theatre*
 The Boys Next Door; Comedy Theatre*
 Marya; Old Vic*
 The Beaux Stratagem; Royal National Theatre*
 Ice Cream; Royal Court Theatre*
 Serious Money; Royal Court Theatre & Wyndham's Theatre*; Broadway, New York City
 A Midsummer Night's Dream; Regent's Park Open Air Theatre*
 No End of Blame; Oxford Playhouse, Oxford & Royal Court Theatre
 Once a Catholic; Wyndham's Theatre*
 Misalliance; Birmingham Rep
 The Amazons; Actor's Company
 The Entertainer; Actor's Company

(* London's West End)

Audiobooks
 Inkdeath
 Magyk
 The Book Thief
 The Castle
 The Keys to the Kingdom
 Smoke
 The Vorrh
 Magpie Murders
 Moonflower Murders

Video games
 Harry Potter and the Sorcerer's Stone (2001): Professor Severus Snape / Argus Filch / Filius Flitwick / Gringotts Goblin (voice)
 Harry Potter and the Chamber of Secrets (2002): Severus Snape / Filius Flitwick / Lucius Malfoy/Sorting Hat (voice, as Allan Cordunner)
 Harry Potter and the Prisoner of Azkaban (2004): Severus Snape / Filius Flitwick (voice, as Allan Cordunner)
 Harry Potter and the Order of the Phoenix (2007): Severus Snape / Argus Filch / Professor Basil Fronsac / Reginald Oddpick (voice)
 Dragon Quest Swords: The Masked Queen and the Tower of Mirrors (2008): Xiphos (English version, voice)
 Harry Potter and the Half-Blood Prince (2009): Argus Filch (voice)
 Ni no Kuni: Wrath of the White Witch (2011): Apus (English version, voice)
 Transformers Universe (2014): Ironhide (voice)
 Bloodborne (2015): Gehrman (voice)
 Final Fantasy XIV: Heavensward  (2015): Midgardsormr / Eynzahr Slafyrsyn (English version, voice)
 Final Fantasy XIV: Endwalker  (2021): Quintus van Cinna (English version, voice)

References

External links
 
 

1950 births
English male film actors
English male television actors
English male voice actors
English male video game actors
Jewish English male actors
Gay Jews
Swedish gay actors
Swedish gay musicians
Living people
People educated at University College School
English gay actors
English people of German-Jewish descent
English people of Russian-Jewish descent
English people of Finnish descent
English gay musicians
Swedish people of German-Jewish descent
Swedish people of Finnish-Jewish descent
Swedish people of Russian-Jewish descent
Swedish emigrants to the United Kingdom
Male actors from London
Male actors from Stockholm
20th-century Swedish LGBT people
21st-century Swedish LGBT people
20th-century English LGBT people
21st-century English LGBT people